Dewey Bozella (born 1959) is a former professional boxer who is known for being wrongfully imprisoned. Convicted in 1983 for the murder of an elderly woman, Bozella served 26 years in prison before his conviction was overturned in 2009 after being proved innocent.

Youth

Bozella was nine when his father beat his pregnant mother so badly that she later died.  He was a witness to the beating.  His father ran away and never returned. One of his brothers was stabbed to death, another was shot and killed, and a third died of AIDS. As a teenager, Bozella trained for a time with former two-time world Heavyweight champion boxer Floyd Patterson. At 20,  Bozella was sentenced to nearly three years in prison for attempted robbery. He earned a bachelor's degree from Mercy College and a master's from New York Theological Seminary.

Alleged offense and wrongful conviction
In 1977, 92-year-old Emma Crapser was murdered in her Poughkeepsie, New York apartment. Police alleged that Crapser walked in on a burglary that was being committed by a then 18-year-old Bozella, who then killed her. In 1983, Bozella was convicted of murder and sentenced to 20 years to life in prison. He continued to claim he was innocent and refused to admit to the crimes he was alleged to have committed, even when in front of the parole board, who denied him parole on four occasions. Bozella contacted the Innocence Project, who agreed to examine his case. When the Innocence Project discovered that there was no DNA evidence remaining to be tested, they referred the case to WilmerHale. Lawyers at WilmerHale discovered new evidence that had been suppressed by prosecutors showing Bozella was in fact innocent and had been framed. Supreme Court Justice James Rooney of Putnam County, New York agreed that the Dutchess County District Attorney, John King, had failed to disclose crucial evidence which would have proved Bozella's innocence.  On October 28, 2009, Bozella was finally released from prison after serving 26 years.

Prison life
Bozella was imprisoned in New York State, including at Sing Sing Correctional Facility in Ossining, New York. While incarcerated at Sing Sing, he became the prison's light heavyweight boxing champion.

Life after prison
On October 28, 2009, after being released from custody, Bozella began working with youths at a local gym in Newburgh, New York. At the gym, which is now closed, he worked with teenagers teaching them about boxing and about the dangers of joining gangs. He frequently visits various organizations to deliver speeches about his life experiences. Bozella is a frequent sight at New York City area boxing cards.

Bozella currently lives in Fishkill, New York with his wife, Trena. While accepting an award in 2011, he told an ESPN reporter that he still dreamed of having at least one professional fight one day. In 2011, boxing champion Bernard Hopkins helped Bozella's dream come true.

2011 ESPY Awards
On July 13, 2011, Bozella's life was chronicled in ESPN's annual ESPY Award show in the Nokia Theatre at L.A. Live in Los Angeles, where he was honored as the recipient of the Arthur Ashe Courage Award.

Professional debut
On October 15, 2011, at the age of 52 years, Bozella won his professional boxing debut on the undercard of the Bernard Hopkins vs Chad Dawson match-up at Staples Center in Los Angeles, California, against Larry Hopkins by a 4-round unanimous decision.
Bozella had been training with Bernard Hopkins in Philadelphia. President Barack Obama telephoned Bozella to wish him luck in the upcoming fight.

Appearances

In 2012, Bozella was a guest at the Ring 10 Veteran's Boxing Foundation 2nd Annual Fundraiser where he credited boxing and the champions with whom he shared the dais for saving his life.

Memoir
In 2016, Bozella published his memoir, Stand Tall: Fighting For My Life, Inside and Outside the Ring.

Professional boxing record

| style="text-align:center;" colspan="8"|1 Wins (0 knockouts), 0 Losses, 0 Draws, 0 No Contest
|-  style="text-align:center; background:#e3e3e3;"
|  style="border-style:none none solid solid; "|Res.
|  style="border-style:none none solid solid; "|Record
|  style="border-style:none none solid solid; "|Opponent
|  style="border-style:none none solid solid; "|Type
|  style="border-style:none none solid solid; "|Rd., Time
|  style="border-style:none none solid solid; "|Date
|  style="border-style:none none solid solid; "|Location
|  style="border-style:none none solid solid; "|Notes
|- align=center
|Win||1-0||align=left| Larry Hopkins	
|||4 (4)|| 
|align=left|
|align=left|
|- align=center

See also
 Rubin "Hurricane" Carter, a boxer who served 18 years for murder before his conviction was set aside in 1985
Innocent prisoner's dilemma
 List of wrongful convictions in the United States

References

External links

1959 births
Living people
African-American boxers
American sportspeople convicted of crimes
Overturned convictions in the United States
Legal history of New York (state)
American people wrongfully convicted of murder
American male boxers
People from Fishkill, New York
Boxers from New York (state)
Mercy College (New York) alumni
Wilmer Cutler Pickering Hale and Dorr
21st-century African-American people
20th-century African-American sportspeople